Jeu du Saint Sang is a Belgian passion play, performed in Bruges. It was first published in 1938, and translated into French by Émile Schwartz. The custom is for the modern mystery play to be performed every fifth year, usually July or August, at the great market place in Bruges before the medieval cloth hall.

See also
Basilica of the Holy Blood

References

Bibliography
Joseph Boon. (1947).Sanguis Christi, Le jeu du Saint Sang de Bruges in three acts and a prologue, French translation Émile Schwartz, éd. Renouveau « La Source », Bruxelles,

External links
Complete reference guide to the Low Countries, Simon & Schuster, 1967

Belgian plays
Culture in Bruges
1938 plays
Christian plays
Plays set in the 1st century
Plays based on the Bible